A ski film is a motion picture with sequences of expedition, recreation, competition, or acrobatic exhibition on snow skis.  These non-fiction action sport films capture the experience of an athletic outdoor snow sporting culture.  Ski films typically present one or more techniques (ski jumping, cross-country, downhill, freestyle), locations, or skiers (expert, celebrity or novice).  Categories include the feature, documentary of competition or other event coverage (such as a snow festival or sportscast), instruction or technique demonstration, retrospective history, travel guide showcasing a region, or a short subject (such as a web series or included in a newsreel). More than 200 such videos debuted in 2006.  Notable examples are listed at the Ski and Snowboard Film Institute, or have received awards from the International Ski Film Festival, X-Dance Action Sports Film Festival, IF3 International Freeski Film Festival, Cold Smoke Winter Film, Powder magazine, or similar.

Feature film
Feature-length entertainment films about skiing, skiers, and the ski lifestyle, shot in actual locations around the world and featuring the best skiers of the day, have been released annually since 1938.  Although not distributed through normal film channels, these movies were first exhibited on the resort, club, film festival and ski show circuit and are now available via internet video or home video.

Official film trailers, released to advertise the coming feature, present highlights of the film.  Feature content typically includes 
Title sequence indicating major sponsors,
sequences of multiple descents through varied terrain features, both 
natural (meadow, tree glades, glacier, couloir, cliff) and 
manmade (groomed slopes, moguls, jump ramps, race course markers, half-pipe, jibs, urban landscape), 
location scenery, 
introduction of participants and transitions with voice-over narration,
contemporary or classic music soundtrack,
closing credits listing filming locations, all sponsors, and any segments outsourced to other production teams.

Many features include sequences of other mountain, airborne, water, or speed sports.  Slow motion and time-lapse effects and skier point of view shots have been used in ski films since the first features of Dr. Fanck. Many film makers release a film early in the ski season, with content recorded in the past season or two.  The following list is a chronology of prolific feature production companies or directors with numerous ski films over the indicated time span.

Feature-length film series
annual Bergfilme of Arnold Fanck, documentary and dramas (1920 - 1931)
Victor Coty ski films (1933 - 1969)
Frank Howard Films (1935 - 1960)
annual Sidney Shurcliff films (1938 - 1941) 
annual John Jay Films (1940 - 1970)
Hans Thorner films (1948 - 1955)
annual Warren Miller and successor Warren Miller Entertainment films (1950–present)
annual Hans Gmoser films (1958 - 1968)
annual Dick Barrymore films (1961 - 1980)
Willy Bogner, Jr. films (1966 - 2009)
annual Greg Stump films (1985 - 1998, 2012)
Peter Chrzanowski films (1988 - 1997)
annual films by James Angrove and Jon Long of Real Action Pictures (1988 - 1998)
 and Nuit de la Glisse films (1989–present)
Scott Gaffney Productions and Straight Up Films (1993 - 1999)
annual films by Teton Gravity Research (1996–present)
annual films by Steve Winter and Murray Wais of Matchstick Productions (1997–present)
annual Sky Pinnick and Rage Films (2002 - 2009)
annual Howell brothers’ Powderwhore Productions (2005 - 2015)
annual films by John DeCesare and Poor Boyz Productions (2007–present)
annual films by Josh Berman's Level 1 Productions (2009 - 2019)
recent films by Sherpas Cinema, etc.

Other films
Many ski film makers have initially or predominately released featurettes and short films, in addition to features.

Featurette and short film series
Winston Pote winter films (1927 - 1943)
annual Marcel Ichac ski films (1934 - 1950, 1957, 1972)
Dick Durrance films (1940 - 1993)
Sverre Engen films (1944 - 1962)
annual  and Cinépress ski films (1959 - 1984)
Roger Brown and Barry Corbet freestyle Summit Films (1967 - 1988, 2012)
Harvey Edwards Films (1970 - 1986)
Joe Jay Jalbert Productions (1970–present)
Alain Gaimard and Didier Lafond Apocalypse Snow series and other ski films (1981 - 1986, 2008)
annual Dominique Perret and Vertical Zoo films (1990 - 2012)
annual Poor Boyz Productions (1996 - 2006)
annual Free Radicals series films (1996 - 2011)
Two Plank Productions (1997 - 2012)  
Kris Ostness and Wind-Up Films (1999 - 2008)
annual Darrell Miller and Storm Show Studios (2000–present)
annual Geoff McDonald and Meathead Films (2000 - 2010)
annual Level 1 Productions (2000–present)
annual Josh Murphy and Unparalleled Productions (2000 - 2004)
annual Pléhouse Films (2001 - 2007)
annual Lionel Géhin and WW Productions (2001 - 2008)
annual Martini brothers Stept Productions (2002 - 2014)
annual Falquet brothers' FLK productions (2002–present)
annual Heart Films (2006–present)
AJ Dakoulas and Andrew Napier's 4Bi9 Media (2007–present)
annual Eric Pollard and Nimbus Independent productions (2007–present)
annual Mike Douglas and Switchback Entertainment productions (2007–present)
annual Nicholas Waggoner and Sweetgrass Productions (2008–present)
annual Legs of Steel releases (2010–present)
annual Dubsatch Collective releases (2011–present)
annual releases from the Bunch (2013–present)

Ski film may also refer to a fictional theatrical-release sports film which incorporates a skiing theme, although the on-snow scenes may have been enhanced by the use of stunt doubles for the actors and special effects.

Film festivals

Ski, snow, adventure and mountain film festivals are held in Switzerland (Les Diablerets/FIFAD), Austria (Graz, St. Anton), Germany (Tegernsee), Italy (Cortina, Trento), France (Annecy, Dijon, Val d'Isère, Chamonix), Russia (Moscow), Spain (Torello), Canada (Banff, Montreal, Whistler, Rossland), United Kingdom (London FreeSki, Fort William, Kendal), New Zealand (Wanaka) and United States (Ishpeming, Jackson Hole, Steamboat Springs, New York City, Midwest, Crested Butte, Mammoth, Missoula, Lake Tahoe, Stowe, North Bend, Boulder, Whitefish, Flagstaff, Williamstown, Mount Snow).

See also
 List of Winter Olympic documentary films
 List of mainstream films with skiing scenes
 List of sports films#Skiing
 Surf film
 Travel documentary
 Winter sport

References

Azallion, Nancy (Oct 1967) 'Skiing movies going "legit"' Skiing Vol. 20, No. 1:121-122
Oliver, Peter (1991) "Reel Life: Ski filmmaking through the years", Skiing, Vol 44 No 3: 150-155
Audisio, Aldo; Natta Soleri, Angelica (1997) Snow & Ski : Neve E Sci Nei Manifesti del Cinema 
Yaple, Henry M. (2004) Ski Bibliography 1890-2002 International Skiing History Association, items 1487-2123, 3630-4287
Masia, Seth (2006) "Moving Pictures" Skiing Heritage Journal Vol. 18, No. 3: 37-39
Anthony, Leslie (2010) White Planet: A Mad Dash Through Modern Global Ski Culture Greystone Books Ltd  pp 83–84, 213-220, 295
Sax, David (2013) "Skiing Films Now Have Stories to Match the Stunts" New York Times

External links 
 ski movies album at Vimeo
 Ski Film Catalogue at x-tremevideo.com
 Trailer Park at Powder.com
 Stone, Ethan (2021) Ski Trailer Yard at downdays.eu
 Reel Deal at Ski magazine
 Trailer Time at freeskier.com
 Reviews and trailers at offpistemag.com
 Larsson, Tim (2021) “Classic Ski Movies: Where did they go?” at RedBull.com
 Anthony, Leslie (2021) “Range rover: Ski films redux” Pique newsmagazine
 ESPN Action Sports Ski and Snowboard Video Awards
 Skiing (Oct 2009) The Cinema pg 26-27

Skiing films
Skiing mass media
Snowboarding mass media
Documentary films about sports